Jessica Boehrs (born 5 March 1980) is a German actress and singer. She is best known as the singer of the Eurodance project Novaspace between 2002 and 2006, and for her role in the 2004 American comedy film EuroTrip.

Career
Boehrs started appearing in various German TV productions in her early to mid-teens, most notably in the 1995 television film Die Kreuzfahrt. The following year, she started her singing career in the band JessVaness. Their only release was the 1997 single "Bla Bla Bla" on ZYX Music which wasn't a commercial success. Boehrs was a background singer for the boy band Caught in the Act and the hip-hop trio Tic Tac Toe. She then made guest appearances in such TV series as Die Rote Meile, SOKO München and Marienhof.

In 2002, Boehrs became the singer of the Eurodance musical duo Novaspace. They achieved international success with dance covers of the 1980s songs "Time After Time", "Guardian Angel" and "Beds Are Burning", among others, particularly in German-speaking countries. During her five years in Novaspace, she released three albums and scored five international top 10 hits. In 2004, Boehrs appeared in the American sex comedy EuroTrip as Mieke, the object of the main character's European vacation quest.

Between 2006 and 2007, she played Nina in the German television program Schloss Einstein on KiKa and appeared in the comedy series Zack! Comedy nach Maß on Sat.1. From March to October 2008, she played the role of Jana in over 100 episodes of the soap opera Sturm der Liebe (Storm of Love). In 2010, Boehrs made her first appearance in the series Kreuzfahrt ins Glück, where she would play the recurring character Andrea. In 2012, she appeared in one episode of the telenovela Anna und die Liebe. In the following years, Boehrs occasionally played small roles in various TV series, such as SOKO Stuttgart (2018) and Familie Dr. Kleist (2019).

Personal life
Boehrs lives in Munich and Potsdam, and married actor Marcus Grüsser in July 2010. The couple split up in March 2015. Her son was born in September 2015.

Filmography

Films

TV series

Discography

Albums
 2003: Supernova
 2004: Cubes
 2006: DJ Edition

Singles
 1997: "Bla Bla Bla"
 2002: "Time After Time"
 2002: "To France"
 2002: "Guardian Angel"
 2003: "Dancing with Tears in My Eyes"
 2003: "Paradise"
 2003: "Run to You"
 2004: "Beds Are Burning"
 2004: "So Lonely"
 2006: "All Through the Night"

References

External links
 
 

1980 births
Living people
German film actresses
Actors from Magdeburg
Musicians from Magdeburg
20th-century German actresses
21st-century German actresses
21st-century German women singers
German television actresses
German women pop singers